USS Leary may refer to the following ships of the United States Navy:

 , a  launched in 1918 and sunk in action in 1943
 , a  launched in 1945; decommissioned in 1973; transferred to Spain as Langara; struck and scrapped in 1992

See also
 

United States Navy ship names

de:Leary
fr:Leary
pt:Leary